Mair is a surname in the Scots and German  languages, deriving from Latin maior ('greater'). Notable people with the surname include:

People with the surname Mair in Scots context
 Adam Mair (born 1979), Canadian ice hockey player
 Alexander Mair (1889–1969), Premier of New South Wales (1939–1941)
 Charles Mair, Canadian poet, son of Scottish immigrants
 Ernest Mair, Australian rugby league football coach
 Eddie Mair, Scottish television and radio presenter
 Gilbert Mair (trader) (1799–1857), sailor and trader in New Zealand 
 William Gilbert Mair (1832–1912), soldier, son of above 
 Gilbert Mair (soldier) (1843–1923), soldier, son of above 
 Ken Mair, activist, descendant of above 
 Lee Mair (born 1980), Scottish footballer 
 Norman Mair, Scottish rugby player and analyst
 Rafe Mair, Canadian political commentator
 Robert Mair, Master of Jesus College, Cambridge
 Sarah Mair (1846–1941), Scottish campaigner for women's suffrage and education
 William Mair (South Australian politician) (died 1897), member of the South Australian House of Assembly
 Bill Mair (1900–1964), Australian politician, member of the Victorian Legislative Council
 William Mair (chemist) (1868–1948), Scottish pharmacist and manufacturing chemist
 William Mair (moderator) (1830–1920), Scottish minister
 William Crosbie Mair (died 1831), Scottish physician

People with the surname Mair in German context
Mair von Landshut, late 15th-century German engraver.
Amanda Mair, Swedish singer and musician
Franz Mair (1821–1893), Austrian composer and choral conductor
Paulus Hector Mair (1517–1579), Augsburg civil servant
Michael Mair (born 1962), Italian skier
Natascha Mair, Austrian ballet dancer
 Victor H. Mair, American Professor of Chinese Language and Literature
Wolfgang Mair (born 1980), Austrian footballer

See also
Maier
Mayer (disambiguation)
Mayr
Meyer (disambiguation)
Meyr (disambiguation)
Meier
Meir (disambiguation)

Surnames of Scottish origin
German-language surnames
Yiddish-language surnames
Surnames of South Tyrolean origin